The variable dancer (Argia fumipennis) is a damselfly of the family Coenagrionidae. It is native to North America, where it is widespread throughout the east and present in the interior western United States.

The male of the subspecies A. f. violacea (the violet dancer) is purple with a blue tip.

Subspecies
Argia fumipennis has three subspecies:
Black dancer A. f. atra
Smoky-winged dancer A. f. fumipennis
Violet dancer A. f. violacea

References

Coenagrionidae
Odonata of North America
Insects described in 1839